Vrbica is a village in Serbia. It is situated in the Čoka municipality, North Banat District, Vojvodina province. The village has a Hungarian ethnic majority (92.07%) and its population according to the 2002 census numbering 404 people.

Historical population

1961: 1,220
1971: 988
1981: 654
1991: 548
2002: 404

See also
List of places in Serbia
List of cities, towns and villages in Vojvodina

References
Slobodan Ćurčić, Broj stanovnika Vojvodine, Novi Sad, 1996.

External links
History of Vrbica

Populated places in Serbian Banat
Čoka